Seeking Gaddafi: Libya, the West and the Arab Spring is a biographical account of the Libyan revolutionary and politician Muammar Gaddafi written by the British politician Daniel Kawczynski. It was first published by Biteback Publishing in 2010, with a second edition containing several revisions being published in 2011.

References

Bibliography

2010 non-fiction books
Muammar Gaddafi